Arthur Bruce Gill (December 12, 1876 – November 7, 1965) was an American football coach, orthopedic surgeon and college professor. He served as the head football coach at Muskingum College—now known as Muskingum University—in New Concord, Ohio from 1895 to 1896, compiling a record of 3–1. Gill received his medical degree from the University of Pennsylvania in 1905 where he remained a professor of orthopedic surgery until 1942.

Head coaching record

References

1876 births
1965 deaths
American orthopedic surgeons
Muskingum Fighting Muskies football coaches
Perelman School of Medicine at the University of Pennsylvania alumni
Perelman School of Medicine at the University of Pennsylvania faculty
People from Greensburg, Pennsylvania